The 1944–45 Northern Rugby Football Union season was the sixth (and would be the last) season of the rugby league’s Wartime Emergency League necessitated by the Second World War.
As in the previous (fifth) Wartime season, the clubs each played a different number of games, but this season clubs re-joined the league and there were now 17 of the original clubs taking part in the Competition (but still only Oldham, St Helens and Wigan from west of the Pennines). 
The League remained as one single amalgamated Championship.

General Comments

Season summary

The 1944–45 season began on Saturday 2 September 1944.

As in the previous season, there are still only the three Lancashire clubs who have not had to close down and withdrawn from the League. The Northern Rugby League continued with a single (now) 17 club single Competition. As the clubs are still playing different number of marches, the league positions and the title would be decided on a percentage basis...

At the completion of the regular season Bradford Northern  were on top of the league on the percentage success (with 34 points from 20 games and a percentage success of 85.00%) with Halifax second (27 points from 16 games @ 84.38%).
Last season’s League Leaders Wakefield Trinity although with the same number of points as Bradford Northern had played more games and finished in third position with 34 points from 23 games – percentage success 73.91%
Wigan finished with one point more than Bradford Northern but had played 4 more games and finished fourth (with a record of played 24 points 35 points and 72.92%)
Castleford  finished in a creditable 6th position in their first season back after an earlier withdrawal. 
St. Helens, for the third consecutive season, finished (this time joint with York.) bottom (16th out of the 17 clubs) with only 9 points from 23 games and with a points difference of (minus)  -217. The two clubs had almost identical records  – but St. Helens avoided the wooden spoon as they had a better points record than York (points difference (minus)-273). .
Bradford Northern  beat Halifax 26-20 on aggregate in the two legged play-off final. and win the Championship..
The Wartime Emergency League did not count as an official league championship.

In the Final of the Rugby league Challenge Cup, Huddersfield beat Bradford Northern 13-9 on aggregate over two legs in front of an aggregate crowd of 26,541.

The Lancashire County Cup, suspended for season 1940–41 remained so for the rest of the war and again Wigan competed in the Yorkshire Cup.

In the Final of the Yorkshire County Cup, Halifax beat Hunslet by 14-3 on aggregate in two low scoring legs before an aggregate crowd of 20,800.

Change in Club participation

Previous withdrawals

The following clubs had withdrawn from the League, before this 1944–45 season's completion began:-
St Helens Recs – who folded before the war started.
Hull Kingston Rovers – who withdrew after the end of the first (1939–40) season finished and did not rejoin until the 1945–46 season. 
Rochdale Hornets – As Hull Kingston Rovers.
Widnes – As Hull Kingston Rovers.
Liverpool Stanley – withdrew after the end of the second 1940–41 season finished and did not rejoin until the 1945–46 season.
Salford – As Liverpool Stanley.
Swinton – As Liverpool Stanley. 
Warrington – As Liverpool Stanley. 
Broughton Rangers – withdrew early in the 1941–42 season and did not rejoin until the 1945–46 season.
Leigh - During the Second World War, the club was forced to leave its ground as the adjacent cable factory extended onto the land.
The townsfolk of Leigh, acting on chairman James Hilton's inspiration, cleared some fields on the edge of the town, and built a new stadium, including moving and rebuilding the old grandstand from the original ground.
In 1941–42, Leigh quit the wartime Lancashire league and would not return to the league until 1946–47 when they played as a temporary measure at the Athletic Ground, Holden Road before moving to Kirkhall Lane (which was later officially renamed Hilton Park after James Hilton).
Bramley – withdrew after the end of the third 1941–42 season finished and did not re-join until the 1945–46 season. 
Castleford – withdrew after the end of the third 1941–42 season finished and did not participate for two seasons, re-joining for the 1944–45 season.

New withdrawals

There were no more new withdrawals

Clubs Re-joining

Castleford – had withdrawn after the end of the third 1941–42 season finished and did not participate for two seasons, now re-joined for this 1944–45 season. 
Barrow and Hunslet who had re-joined the previous season, continued.

Special Note

Dewsbury had a relatively successful time during the war years. Managed by Eddie Waring, and with the side boosted by the inclusion of a number of big-name guest players, the club won the Wartime Emergency League in 1941–42 and again the following season 1942–43  (though that championship was declared null and void when it was discovered they had played an ineligible player). They were also runners-up in the Championship in 1943–44, Challenge Cup winners in 1943 and Yorkshire Cup Final appearances in this season 1940–41 and winners in 1942–43.

Championship

Heading Abbreviations
RL = Single division; Pl = Games played;  W = Win; D = Draw; L = Lose; PF = Points for; PA = Points against; Diff = Points difference (+ or -); Pts = League points
% Pts = A percentage system was used to determine league positions due to clubs playing varying number of fixtures and against different opponents 
League points: for win = 2; for draw = 1;  for loss = 0.

Championship play-off

Championship Play-Off:
Semifinals:
Bradford Northern 18 beat Wigan 15 (Odsal)
Halifax 17 beat Wakefield Trinity 11 (Thrum Hall)
Final (two legs):
Halifax 9 beat Bradford Northern 2 (Thrum Hall)
Bradford Northern 24 beat Halifax 11 (Odsal)
Bradford Northern won 26-20 on aggregate

Trophies

Challenge Cup

The Challenge Cup Competition had been suspended for season 1939–40, but after being re-introduced for the following season 1940–41 continued again this season. 
Each round including the final was played in two legs on a home and away basis

Below are given some of the fixtures and results from this year’s Challenge Cup competition.

In the Final of the Rugby league Challenge Cup, Huddersfield beat Bradford Northern 13-9 on aggregate over two legs in front of an aggregate crowd of 26,541.

Lancashire Cup

The Lancashire County Cup, suspended for season 1940–41 remained so for the rest of the war and again Wigan competed in the Yorkshire Cup.

Yorkshire Cup

Below are given some of the fixtures and results from this year’s Yorkshire Cup competition.

In the Final of the Yorkshire County Cup, Halifax beat Hunslet in two low scoring legs by 14-3 on aggregate before an aggregate crowd of 20,800.

Notes and comments

Note on the first peacetime league programme which would take place in 1945–46 

With the ending of the hostilities in Europe in May 1945 and the Far East in September 1945, a full league programme commences. 
All of the clubs who took part in the last peacetime competition in 1938-39 re-joined the league with the exceptions of :- 
St Helens Recs – who folded before the war started. 
Leigh – who had lost their ground and would not re-join for a further season until 1946–47

See also 
 British rugby league system
 1939–40 Northern Rugby Football League Wartime Emergency League season
 1940–41 Northern Rugby Football League Wartime Emergency League season
 1941–42 Northern Rugby Football League Wartime Emergency League season
 1942–43 Northern Rugby Football League Wartime Emergency League season
 1943–44 Northern Rugby Football League Wartime Emergency League season
 1944–45 Northern Rugby Football League Wartime Emergency League season
 The Great Schism – Rugby League View
 The Great Schism – Rugby Union View
 List of defunct rugby league clubs
 Dewsbury

References

External links 
Saints Heritage Society
Cherry and white 
Hull&Proud
Widnes Vikings - One team, one passion Season In Review
Warrington History
[Rothmans Rugby League Yearbook 1990-91 by Raymond Fletcher and David Howes]

1944 in English rugby league
1945 in English rugby league
Northern Rugby Football League seasons